Arcon may refer to:

People
 Arcon 2, musician
 Jean Le Michaud d'Arçon (1733–1800), French general
 Luis Arcon, Venezuelan boxer
 Sandi Arčon (born 1991), Slovenian football player

Places
 Arcon, Loire, France
 Arçon, Doubs, France

Other
 Arcon ARX or ARX (operating system)